Pecco is a frazione (hamlet) of the comune (municipality) of Val di Chy in the Metropolitan City of Turin in the Italian region Piedmont, located about  north of Turin. It was a separate comune until January 2019.

Cities and towns in Piedmont
Val di Chy